Shahroud University of Medical Sciences (SHMU) is public medical school located in Shahrud, the capital of Shahrud County, in the Iranian province of Semnan.

External links

Medical schools in Iran
Science and technology in Iran
Scientific organisations based in Iran
Shahrud, Iran
Universities in Iran
Education in Semnan Province
Buildings and structures in Semnan Province